Raymond Moos Redheffer (April 17, 1921 – May 13, 2005) was an American mathematician. He was the creator of one of the first electronic games, Nim, a knowledge game.

Early life 
He earned his PhD in 1948 from the Massachusetts Institute of Technology under Norman Levinson.

Career 
He taught as a Peirce Fellow at Harvard from 1948 to 1950. His teaching skills were acknowledged 6 decades later by one of his students. He taught for 55 years at the University of California, Los Angeles, writing more than 200 research papers and three textbooks. 

Notable and unusual is the physically motivated discussion of the functions of vector calculus in his book with Sokolnikoff. He is known for the Redheffer matrix, the Redheffer star product, and for (with Charles Eames) his 1966 timeline of mathematics entitled Men of Modern Mathematics that was printed and distributed by IBM. He collaborated with Eames on a series of short films about mathematics, and may have invented a version of Nim with electronic components.

Recognition 

 UCLA Distinguished Teaching Award (1969).

Books

.
.
.

References

1921 births
2005 deaths
20th-century American mathematicians
21st-century American mathematicians
Massachusetts Institute of Technology alumni
University of California, Los Angeles faculty